Instituto Español de Estudios Estratégicos (IEEE) is the research center about Strategic studies of the Ministerio de Defensa of Spain who is  responsible for coordinating, promoting and disseminating the cultural action of the ministry. It is part of the Centro Superior de Estudios de la Defensa Nacional (CESEDEN).

Its publications are Cuadernos de Estrategia, Panorama Estratégico, Energía y Geoestrategia, and Revista Digital.

References

External links
 

Think tanks based in Spain
Think tanks established in 1970
Research institutes established in 1970
Strategic studies